Public Prep is an organization that operates single-sex charter schools in New York City.

Grades offered 
 Girls Prep Lower East Side Elementary- serves grades K-4
 Girls Prep Lower East Side Middle- serves grades 5-8
 Girls Prep Bronx Elementary- serves grades K-5
 Girls Prep Bronx Middle- serves grades 6-7 for the 2015-16 school year and will grow a grade each year through 8th grade
 Boys Prep Bronx Elementary- serves grades K-2 for the 2015-16 school year and will grow a grade each year through 8th grade
 PrePrep: the Joan Ganz Cooney Early Learning Program- serves four-year-olds

Academics 

The schools implement a curriculum aligned with the Common Core State Standards.

Public Prep is in the second year of a three-year timeline for the Curriculum Development Initiative focused on establishing an interdisciplinary, knowledge-based curriculum in all content areas — including fitness and the arts.

Beginning in Kindergarten, students are taught science five days a week by a dedicated science teacher. In the 14-15 school year, more than 75 students engaged in science and/or engineering programming at Cornell University, West Point, the US Naval Academy, i3 STEM Camps, and the Liberty Science Center.

Federal law forbids gender discrimination. However, the U.S. Department of Education has provided nonregulatory guidance to the effect that if comparable facilities are provided for both boys and girls then single-sex schools are permitted, and comparable facilities are, both at Excellence Charter School of Bedford Stuyvesant and in other schools in the city, including for boys only. State law allows single-sex schools (Education Law subdiv. 2854(2)).

Student demographics

Ethnic and racial demography

Management 
The Chief Executive Officer is Ian Rowe. Prior to joining Public Prep in 2010, Rowe was with the Gates Foundation, MTV, and The White House USA Freedom Corps office.

Public Prep is governed by a Board of Trustees; the Public Prep Network Board is the charter management organization that supports and manages the schools, while the Public Prep Academies Board is the separate board that oversees individual schools.

Finances 
Public Prep schools are tuition-free. Charter schools are provided public per pupil revenue reimbursements. It is the second year of incremental increases of charter school per pupil expenditure in New York City. Public Prep schools receive $13,877 per pupil in FY 15-16, and are expected to receive $14,027 per pupil in FY 16-17.

Founding 
Girls Prep was founded in 2005 by Eric Grannis, Bryan Lawrence, and Miriam Lewis Raccah. Public Prep was established in 2009 to support Girls Prep Lower East Side, its replication school in the Bronx, and future public schools.

Professional affiliation 
Public Prep (as Girls Prep) is a member of the National Coalition of Girls' Schools.

Admissions and costs 

Public Prep schools are tuition-free.

Students are accepted by a random lottery. Enrollment preference is given to applicants with siblings enrolled in the Public Prep school to which they are applying, if they live in the district of the school to which they are applying, or to applicants who reside in approved NYCHA Housing Developments.

Results

State tests 
The school's management reported, "100% of Girls Prep 3rd and 4th graders scored advanced or proficient on the New York State math & science exams", and "98% of third grade students and 92% of fourth grade students scored advanced or proficient on the New York State ELA ["English Language Arts"] exam." As comparisons, it reported, "[i]n Community School District 1 where Girls Prep [in Manhattan] is located, 91.9% of third graders and 82.8% of fourth graders scored advanced or proficient on the math exam. On the ELA exam, 70.5% of District 1 third graders and 69.5% of fourth graders scored advanced or proficient. In New York City, 91.1% of third graders and 84.4% of fourth graders scored advanced or proficient in Math while 69% of third and fourth graders scored advanced or proficient in ELA."

In 2008, every 3rd and 4th grade student—100%—scored as proficient in math, while 92.0% of 4th graders and 97.7% of 3rd graders scored as proficient in English. By comparison, the whole district did less well, the proficient in English being only 69.5% of 4th graders and 70.5% of 3rd graders and in math 82.8% of 4th graders and 91.9% of 3rd graders. The difference between district-wide scores and Girls Prep scores thus ranges from 8.1% to 27.2%, all of them in Girls Prep students' favor.

References

External links 
 Public Prep Network management organization (website domain now PublicPrep.org, formerly GirlsPrep.org)

Girls' schools in New York City
Boys' schools in New York City
Education in Manhattan
Charter schools in New York City
Public elementary schools in the Bronx
Public middle schools in the Bronx
2005 establishments in New York City
Education companies established in 2005